John Gillies (1712–1796) was a Church of Scotland minister and theological writer.

Life
John Gillies was born at the manse of Careston, near Brechin, where his father, John Gillies, was minister. He took literary and divinity courses at university, and after a time as tutor in several families, he became minister of the College Church, Glasgow on 29 July 1742. In this charge he remained till his death fifty-four years after (29 March 1796). He preached three times every Sunday, delivered discourses in his church three times a week, published for some time a weekly paper, and visited and catechised his parish.

Works
Gillies is best known for Historical Collections relating to the Success of the Gospel, 2 vols. Glasgow, 1754; an appendix was added in 1761, and a supplement in 1786 which had a biography of Gillies by Dr. John Erskine prefixed. It was later updated by Horatius Bonar. This work was an important contribution to the historiography of the First Great Awakening. From a collection of 30 to 40 documented local religious revivals of the previous several decades, Gillies put together a narrative from both sides of the Atlantic, in a context starting at the first Pentecost. Apart from Methodism it dealt also with some groups in the Netherlands and Germany.

Another major work was Devotional Exercises on the New Testament, 2 vols. London, 1769. He published also:

 ‘Exhortations to the Inhabitants of the South Parish of Glasgow,’ 2 vols. Glasgow, 1750; 
 ‘Life of the Rev. Mr. George Whitefield,’ London, 1772; 
 ‘Essays on the Prophecies relating to the Messiah,’ Edinburgh, 1773; 
 ‘Hebrew Manual for the use of Students;’ 
 ‘Psalms of David,’ with notes, Glasgow, 1786; and 
 John Milton's Paradise Lost, illustrated by texts of scripture, London, 1778.

He wrote a life of John MacLaurin for MacLaurin's ‘Sermons and Essays,’ Glasgow, 1755.

Family
His first wife was Elizabeth (d. 1754), daughter of John MacLaurin, known as a preacher; and his second, Joanna (d. 1792), sister of Sir Michael Stewart of Blackhall.

References

Notes

Attribution

1712 births
1796 deaths
18th-century Ministers of the Church of Scotland